= Al-Fadul =

Ethnic group in Arabian Peninsula and Iraq

The Fadul are an influential tribe in the Arabian Peninsula and Iraq.
